Joseph L. Hurd was a wooden steam ship built in Detroit, Michigan, in 1869.

Career
The Joseph L. Hurd was first enrolled in Detroit on September 15, 1869, starting on the Detroit and Saginaw route. The Joseph L. Hurd started carrying stone in October 1904, and she became a barge in 1907.

Beaching
Joseph L. Hurd was beached in Sturgeon Bay in September 1913 and subsequently abandoned by its crew.

References

1869 ships
Shipwrecks